Aisling Dolan (born 1975/76) is an Irish Fine Gael politician who has served as a Senator since June 2020, after being nominated by the Taoiseach.

Political career
Dolan was elected to Galway County Council as an Independent candidate at the 2019 local elections. She joined Fine Gael in November 2019.

Dolan was an unsuccessful Fine Gael candidate in the 2020 general election for the Roscommon–Galway constituency. She was appointed to the Seanad in June 2020. Evelyn Francis Parsons was co-opted to Dolan's seat on Galway County Council following her nomination to the Seanad.

Personal life
Born in Pollboy, Ballinasloe, Dolan attended Ardscoil Mhuire and NUI Galway and received a postgraduate diploma in Applied Languages for Business. Dolan worked in Dublin for Enterprise Ireland and Science Foundation Ireland, supporting Irish businesses and funding excellence in research.

References

External links
Official site
Aisling Dolan's page on the Fine Gael website

Living people
Members of the 26th Seanad
21st-century women members of Seanad Éireann
Local councillors in County Galway
Fine Gael senators
Nominated members of Seanad Éireann
Year of birth missing (living people)
People from Ballinasloe